Emily Dark  (born 8 August 2000) is a Scottish international field hockey player who plays as a defender for Scotland and Great Britain.

She plays club hockey in Scotland for Watsonians Hockey Club.

Dark made her senior international debut for Scotland v Ireland on 22 October 2017, aged 17.

She represented Scotland at the 2019 Women's EuroHockey Championship II.

References

2000 births
Living people
Scottish female field hockey players